Chatuchak Park is a public park in the southwest part of Chatuchak District, Bangkok, Thailand. It is also the name of the Chatuchak Park MRT Station that lies under the park. Its name is the origin name of Chatuchak district.

Chatuchak Park is one of the oldest public parks in Bangkok. It was built on the land formerly owned by the State Railway of Thailand (SRT), in dedication to former King Bhumibol Adulyadej (Rama IX), on the occasion of his 4th cycle (48 years) birthday anniversary on December 5, 1975. The King thus granted the name "Chatuchak" (meaning 4 cycles) to the park. Inside the park, there are many varieties of trees and plants in the garden with different themes, flowers courtyard, multipurpose ground, a clock tower, Princess Sirindhorn's birthday anniversary garden, sculptures from ASEAN countries, and an artificial lake runs along this thin and long park with numerous bridges crossing the lake, as well as inactive train museum. The park is suitable for recreational cum exercise activities. Certified guide dogs are allowed in this park.

It has an area of 0.304 square kilometres. It was later augmented with Queen Sirikit Park and Wachirabenchathat Park, though they are separated from Chatuchak Park by Kamphang Phet 3 Road.

Chatuchak park includes Wachirabenchathat park in the summer (March to April) every year is a time when pink pouis are blooming, especially along the Phaholyothin Road adjacent to the Chatuchak Park MRT Station, causing a picturesque scenery.

Nearby attractions 

 Chatuchak Weekend Market (JJ Market)
 Children's Discovery Museum
 Jatujak Day & Night
 JJ Mall 
 Chatuchak District
 Queen Sirikit Park
 Railway of Thailand Museum
 Lat Phrao Square

External links

Chatuchak Park Information
Chatuchak Park

References 

Parks in Bangkok
Chatuchak district
1975 establishments in Thailand